Pig virus can refer to:

People
Kevin Metheny -  a radio executive famously named "Pig Vomit" by Howard Stern

General
Influenza A virus subtype H1N1 - a satirical name for the H1N1 influenza virus